Yadanar (lit. Jewels) is a 2006 Burmese film directed by Ei Ei Khaing.

Cast
Kyaw Thu
Pho Thaukkya
Zaganar
Kyaw Kyaw Paing Hmu
Htun Eaindra Bo
May Than Nu
Pearl Win
Wyne Su Khine Thein
Than Than Soe

Production

References

Burmese drama films
2006 films
2006 drama films
2000s Burmese-language films